More Than Anything in the World is a 2006 Mexican drama film directed by Andrés León Becker and Javier Solar. It was entered into the 28th Moscow International Film Festival.

Cast
 Elizabeth Cervantes as Emilia
 Juan Carlos Colombo as Hector
 Julia Urbini as Alicia
 Andrés Montiel as Mario
 Daniel Martínez as Doctor
 Silverio Palacios

References

External links
 

2006 films
2006 drama films
Mexican drama films
2000s Spanish-language films
2000s Mexican films